Dragondrums is a young adult science fiction novel by the American-Irish author Anne McCaffrey. Published by Atheneum Books in 1979, it was the sixth to appear in the Dragonriders of Pern series by Anne or her son Todd McCaffrey.

Dragondrums completed the Harper Hall of Pern trilogy one year after The White Dragon completed the Dragonriders of Pern trilogy. Boxed and omnibus editions of both trilogies soon followed.

Plot summary
Dragondrums is the coming of age story of Piemur, a small, quick, clever apprentice at Harper Hall.  When Piemur's clear treble voice changes, his place among the Harpers is no longer certain. He is sent to the drum towers to learn drumming, the primary method of long-distance communication on Pern for non-dragonriders, while his voice settles. There he has to deal with the jealousy and bullying of the other drumming apprentices.  When Masterharper Robinton secretly asks Piemur to be his apprentice, Piemur begins journeying through Pern, gathering information and running discreet errands for the Masterharper. In his adventures throughout Pern, Piemur has only his knowledge and wits to deal with a cruel Lord Holder and rogue dragonriders. He Impresses one of the coveted fire-lizards – a gold he names Farli – as a companion, discovers his place in the world, and earns journeyman status among the Harpers.

The events in Dragondrums take place after Dragonsinger and are contiguous with some events in The White Dragon, which discusses characters and events elsewhere on Pern.

Awards
The American Library Association in 1999 cited these first six Pern books, along with The Ship Who Sang, when McCaffrey received the annual Margaret A. Edwards Award for her "lifetime contribution in writing for teens".

Dragondrums placed eighth for the annual Locus Award for Best Novel and it won the annual Balrog Award in the Novel class.

Notes

References

External links

1979 American novels
1979 science fiction novels
Dragonriders of Pern books
Novels by Anne McCaffrey
Young adult fantasy novels
Atheneum Books books